Murmur of Youth is a 1997 Taiwanese coming of age film directed by Lin Cheng-sheng. Stars Rene Liu and Jing Tseng shared the Best Actress award at the 1997 Tokyo International Film Festival.

Plot
The film follows the parallel stories of Chen Mei-Li (Rene Liu), a middle class suburban girl from a materialistic dysfunctional family, and the shyer, more introverted Ling Mei-li (Jing Tseng), a working-class girl being raised by her father and grandmother in a ramshackle home on the outskirts of town. The two meet when Ling, after dropping out of college when the boy she has a crush on begins dating another girl, takes a job at a local movie theater where she works the ticket booth with Chen. First bonding over their shared name, a close friendship slowly develops between them.

Cast
Rene Liu as Mei-li Chen
Jing Tseng as Mei-li Ling
Chin-Hsin Tsai as Chen's father
Hsiu Li as Chen's mother
Grandma Pi as Grandma
Pi-tung Lien as Lin's dad
Shih-Hsine Wang as Baker
Vicky Wei as Fen baker's girlfriend
Chao-jung Chen as Lin's schoolmate
Jen-Feng Cheng as Chen's brother
Chiung-hua Chen as Chen's sister-in-law

References

External links

 

1997 films
1997 drama films
1990s Mandarin-language films
Central Motion Picture Corporation films
Taiwanese drama films